Victor Manuel Rabanales (born December 23, 1962) is a Mexican former professional boxer. He is a former WBC bantamweight Champion. He was trained by Boxing Hall of Famer Ignacio Beristáin.

Professional career
In August 1983, Rabanales won his pro debut by knocking out veteran Mario Asteaga in Mexico City.

WBC bantamweight title
His first shot at a WBC bantamweight title was against Greg Richardson, but he lost a disputed decision. In Inglewood, California he upset Yong-Hoon Lee to win the Interim WBC bantamweight title. On September 17, 1992 he won the WBC Bantamweight Championship by beating an undefeated Joichiro Tatsuyoshi in Japan. He would lose his title to Byun Jung-il in another very disputed decision in South Korea. He also had close decision losses to an undefeated Wayne McCullough and Sirimongkol Singwancha.

Professional boxing record

See also
List of Mexican boxing world champions
List of bantamweight boxing champions

References

External links

|-

1962 births
Living people
Indigenous Mexicans
Mexican male boxers
Boxers from Chiapas
Bantamweight boxers
World bantamweight boxing champions
World Boxing Council champions